White corn may mean:

 White varieties of field corn (U.S. usage)
 Whitecorn, Missouri, a community in the United States

See also

 Maize (disambiguation)
 
 White (disambiguation)
 Corn (disambiguation)